The 2011–12 Turkish Basketball League, officially named the Beko Basketball League for sponsorship reasons, was the 46th season of the top professional basketball league in Turkey. The regular season started on October 15, 2011 and ended on May 2, 2012. Playoffs started on May 5, 2012

Clubs and arenas

The league consists of the following member clubs:

Regular season

League table

Results
{| style="font-size: 90%; text-align: center" class="wikitable"
|-
|
| align="center" width=50|APE
| width=50|AEF
| width=50|ABB
| width=50|BNK
| width=50|BAN
| width=50|BJK
| width=50|ERD
| width=50|FBÜ
| width=50|GSM
| width=50|HAC
| width=50|MBB
| width=50|OLE
| width=50|KSK
| width=50|TOF
| width=50|TSB
| width=50|TTS
|-
|align=left|Aliağa Petkim
| style="background:#ccc;"|
| style="background:#fdd;"|68–79
| style="background:#dfd;"|89–76
| style="background:#fdd;"|65–67
| style="background:#dfd;"|70–65
| style="background:#fdd;"|80–92
| style="background:#fdd;"|72–74
| style="background:#fdd;"|61–70
| style="background:#fdd;"|83–85
| style="background:#fdd;"|65–75
| style="background:#dfd;"|90–80
| style="background:#dfd;"|67–63
| style="background:#fdd;"|94–98
| style="background:#dfd;"|74–73
| style="background:#dfd;"|87–72
| style="background:#fdd;"|86–89
|-
|align=left|Anadolu Efes
| style="background:#dfd;"|80–65
| style="background:#ccc;"|
| style="background:#dfd;"|77–70
| style="background:#dfd;"|80–56
| style="background:#dfd;"|84–76
| style="background:#fdd;"|77–86
| style="background:#dfd;"|82–53
| style="background:#dfd;"|69–67
| style="background:#fdd;"|65–74
| style="background:#dfd;"|98–64
| style="background:#dfd;"|104–72
| style="background:#dfd;"|81–57
| style="background:#dfd;"|79–74
| style="background:#dfd;"|70–58
| style="background:#dfd;"|91–72
| style="background:#dfd;"|78–70
|-
|align=left|Antalya BB
| style="background:#fdd;"|75–80
| style="background:#fdd;"|102–106
| style="background:#ccc;"|
| style="background:#dfd;"|94–76
| style="background:#fdd;"|79–83
| style="background:#fdd;"|75–85
| style="background:#fdd;"|70–72
| style="background:#fdd;"|77–81
| style="background:#fdd;"|76–88
| style="background:#dfd;"|99–80
| style="background:#dfd;"|86–76
| style="background:#fdd;"|73–78
| style="background:#fdd;"|89–94
| style="background:#dfd;"|88–87
| style="background:#dfd;"|98–77
| style="background:#fdd;"|88–94
|-
|align=left|Bandırma Kırmızı
| style="background:#fdd;"|88–89
| style="background:#fdd;"|71–77
| style="background:#fdd;"|85–92
| style="background:#ccc;"|
| style="background:#fdd;"|65–88
| style="background:#fdd;"|58–79
| style="background:#fdd;"|69–73
| style="background:#dfd;"|77–71
| style="background:#fdd;"|68–79
| style="background:#fdd;"|68–74
| style="background:#fdd;"|63–77
| style="background:#fdd;"|68–74
| style="background:#fdd;"|59–80
| style="background:#fdd;"|65–69
| style="background:#dfd;"|72–67
| style="background:#fdd;"|67–95
|-
|align=left|Banvit
| style="background:#dfd;"|101–77
| style="background:#dfd;"|95–86
| style="background:#dfd;"|77–75
| style="background:#dfd;"|69–62
| style="background:#ccc;"|
| style="background:#dfd;"|86–67
| style="background:#dfd;"|72–64
| style="background:#dfd;"|70–66
| style="background:#fdd;"|64–73
| style="background:#dfd;"|84–66
| style="background:#dfd;"|88–82
| style="background:#dfd;"|89–71
| style="background:#fdd;"|71-79
| style="background:#dfd;"|96–85
| style="background:#dfd;"|90–85
| style="background:#dfd;"|82–76
|-
|align=left|Beşiktaş Milangaz
| style="background:#dfd;"|101–78
| style="background:#dfd;"|83–76
| style="background:#fdd;"|99–100
| style="background:#dfd;"|107–69
| style="background:#fdd;"|61–64
| style="background:#ccc;"|
| style="background:#fdd;"|84–88
| style="background:#dfd;"|83–78
| style="background:#dfd;"|73–65
| style="background:#dfd;"|90–62
| style="background:#dfd;"|105–84
| style="background:#dfd;"|76–69
| style="background:#dfd;"|88–80
| style="background:#dfd;"|81–78
| style="background:#dfd;"|85–57
| style="background:#dfd;"|79–74
|-
|align=left|Erdemir
| style="background:#fdd;"|55–65
| style="background:#fdd;"|53–89
| style="background:#fdd;"|83–88
| style="background:#dfd;"|85–62
| style="background:#fdd;"|60–85
| style="background:#fdd;"|64–81
| style="background:#ccc;"|
| style="background:#fdd;"|68–75
| style="background:#fdd;"|75–83
| style="background:#dfd;"|85–63
| style="background:#fdd;"|65–70
| style="background:#dfd;"|67–64
| style="background:#fdd;"|81–93
| style="background:#dfd;"|77–66
| style="background:#dfd;"|71–62
| style="background:#dfd;"|92–73
|-
|align=left|Fenerbahçe Ülker
| style="background:#dfd;"|85–74
| style="background:#fdd;"|83–90
| style="background:#dfd;"|105–89
| style="background:#dfd;"|93–60
| style="background:#fdd;"|75–79
| style="background:#dfd;"|86–82
| style="background:#dfd;"|77–60
| style="background:#ccc;"|
| style="background:#dfd;"|80–79
| style="background:#dfd;"|81–68
| style="background:#dfd;"|82–81
| style="background:#dfd;"|80–63
| style="background:#dfd;"|102–99
| style="background:#dfd;"|76–68
| style="background:#dfd;"|88–63
| style="background:#fdd;"|64–83
|-
|align=left|Galatasaray Medical Park
| style="background:#dfd;"|90-72
| style="background:#fdd;"|61-69
| style="background:#fdd;"|82–92
| style="background:#dfd;"|74-55
| style="background:#dfd;"|84–73
| style="background:#dfd;"|92–81
| style="background:#dfd;"|85–81
| style="background:#dfd;"|84–72
| style="background:#ccc;"|
| style="background:#dfd;"|83–46
| style="background:#dfd;"|105-67
| style="background:#dfd;"|63–58
| style="background:#dfd;"|79-72
| style="background:#dfd;"|103–102
| style="background:#dfd;"|87-67
| style="background:#dfd;"|82-75
|-
|align=left|Hacettepe Üniv.
| style="background:#dfd;"|86–81
| style="background:#fdd;"|52–75
| style="background:#fdd;"|76–79
| style="background:#fdd;"|69–62
| style="background:#fdd;"|73–78
| style="background:#dfd;"|81–80
| style="background:#fdd;"|73–76
| style="background:#fdd;"|58–79
| style="background:#fdd;"|68–86
| style="background:#ccc;"|
| style="background:#fdd;"|71–73
| style="background:#fdd;"|74–80
| style="background:#fdd;"|75–91
| style="background:#dfd;"|73–67
| style="background:#fdd;"|78–74
| style="background:#dfd;"|80–78
|-
|align=left|Mersin BB
| style="background:#fdd;"|82–89
| style="background:#fdd;"|78–106
| style="background:#dfd;"|102–65
| style="background:#dfd;"|77–72
| style="background:#fdd;"|70–83
| style="background:#fdd;"|82–98
| style="background:#dfd;"|98–81
| style="background:#fdd;"|81–83
| style="background:#dfd;"|106–99
| style="background:#fdd;"|69–75
| style="background:#ccc;"|
| style="background:#dfd;"|91–83
| style="background:#fdd;"|79–93
| style="background:#fdd;"|61–72
| style="background:#dfd;"|92–80
| style="background:#dfd;"|96–85
|-
|align=left|Olin Edirne
| style="background:#fdd;"|72–77
| style="background:#fdd;"|67–88
| style="background:#dfd;"|91–72
| style="background:#dfd;"|81–60
| style="background:#fdd;"|56–72
| style="background:#fdd;"|64–76
| style="background:#fdd;"|62–75
| style="background:#fdd;"|48–81
| style="background:#fdd;"|71–98
| style="background:#dfd;"|87–75
| style="background:#dfd;"|86–81
| style="background:#ccc;"|
| style="background:#fdd;"|65–75
| style="background:#fdd;"|68–77
| style="background:#fdd;"|67–74
| style="background:#fdd;"|85–94
|-
|align=left|Pınar Karşıyaka
| style="background:#dfd;"|88–81
| style="background:#fdd;"|59–71
| style="background:#dfd;"|95–85
| style="background:#dfd;"|89–62
| style="background:#fdd;"|70–83
| style="background:#fdd;"|93–100
| style="background:#dfd;"|80–71
| style="background:#fdd;"|75–77
| style="background:#fdd;"|67–75
| style="background:#dfd;"|100–76
| style="background:#dfd;"|75–69
| style="background:#fdd;"|70–90
| style="background:#ccc;"|
| style="background:#dfd;"|87–66
| style="background:#dfd;"|99–91
| style="background:#fdd;"|98–110
|-
|align=left|Tofaş
| style="background:#fdd;"|65–74
| style="background:#dfd;"|97–96
| style="background:#dfd;"|90–73
| style="background:#dfd;"|77–63
| style="background:#fdd;"|70–78
| style="background:#dfd;"|96–90
| style="background:#dfd;"|74–70
| style="background:#dfd;"|89–87
| style="background:#fdd;"|75–95
| style="background:#fdd;"|71–79
| style="background:#fdd;"|81–88
| style="background:#dfd;"|68–57
| style="background:#fdd;"|74–80
| style="background:#ccc;"|
| style="background:#dfd;"|84–83
| style="background:#dfd;"|83–71
|-
|align=left|Trabzonspor
| style="background:#fdd;"|67–77
| style="background:#fdd;"|64–69
| style="background:#dfd;"|92–63
| style="background:#dfd;"|77–64
| style="background:#fdd;"|72–78
| style="background:#fdd;"|77–81
| style="background:#dfd;"|75–67
| style="background:#fdd;"|74–84
| style="background:#fdd;"|70–88
| style="background:#fdd;"|76–78
| style="background:#fdd;"|66–78
| style="background:#dfd;"|71–69
| style="background:#fdd;"|69–90
| style="background:#fdd;"|72–78
| style="background:#ccc;"|
| style="background:#dfd;"|89–78
|-
|align=left|Türk Telekom
| style="background:#fdd;"|59–78
| style="background:#dfd;"|95-87
| style="background:#dfd;"|94-85
| style="background:#fdd;"|65–72
| style="background:#fdd;"|60–84
| style="background:#fdd;"|88–97
| style="background:#dfd;"|80–76
| style="background:#fdd;"|76–78
| style="background:#fdd;"|74–82
| style="background:#dfd;"|75–73
| style="background:#dfd;"|88–82
| style="background:#dfd;"|77–69
| style="background:#fdd;"|67–88
| style="background:#fdd;"|75–83
| style="background:#dfd;"|103–81
| style="background:#ccc;"|
|-

Playoffs

Individual statistics

Points

Rebounds

Assists

Blocks

Steals
{| class="wikitable" style="text-align: center;"
|-
!Rank
!width=170|Name
!width=120|Team
!width=40|Stl
!width=40|G
!width=40|
|-
|1.||align="left"| Russell Robinson||Trabzonspor||37||18||2.1
|-
|2.||align="left"| Matthew Bryan-Amaning||Hacettepe Üniv.||59||30||2.0
|-
|3.||align="left"| Mire Chatman||Pınar Karşıyaka||60||32||1.9
|-
|4.||align="left"| Jamon Gordon||Galatasaray MP||59||36||1.6
|-
|5.||align="left"| Anthony Grundy||Mersin BB||49||30||1.6

References

External links
Official Site
TBLStat.net History Page

Turkish Basketball Super League seasons
Turkish
1